Richard Payne Nicholson (1814 – 18 February 1845) was an English first-class cricketer and distiller.

The son of John Nicholson, he was born in 1818 at Upper Clapton. He was a member of the family which owned the J&W Nicholson & Co gin distillery based in Clerkenwell and Three Mills. Nicholson made two appearances in first-class cricket, firstly for the Gentlemen in the Gentlemen v Players fixture of 1837 at Lord's, and secondly for the Marylebone Cricket Club against Cambridge Town Club at the same venue. He worked in the family business as a distiller alongside his brother, William, who was also a first-class cricketer and politician. He died in Portugal at Lisbon in February 1845. Brothers John and Ralph both also played first-class cricket.

References

External links

1814 births
1845 deaths
People from Upper Clapton
English cricketers
Gentlemen cricketers
Marylebone Cricket Club cricketers
English brewers
19th-century English businesspeople